A publisher is an organization—or person—distributing content to the public.

Publisher may also refer to:
 Microsoft Publisher, desktop publishing (DTP) software
 "Publisher", a 2007 song on  23 (Blonde Redhead album)
 Preachers within the organizational structure of Jehovah's Witnesses

See also
 Media proprietor
 Publishing rights, a legal concept in music publishing
 Self-publisher